is a railway station in the city of Gifu, Gifu Prefecture, Japan, operated by the private railway operator Meitetsu. It has the station number "NH58".

Lines

Station layout

Chajo Station has two ground-level opposed side platforms connected by a level crossing. The station is unstaffed.

Platforms

Adjacent stations

History
It was renamed Chajo Station on December 14 of the same year.

Surrounding area

See also
 List of railway stations in Japan

References

External links

  

Railway stations in Japan opened in 1914
Stations of Nagoya Railroad
Railway stations in Gifu Prefecture